Tuzi Municipality (Montenegrin: Opština Tuzi / Општина Тузи; Albanian: Komuna e Tuzit) is one of the 24 Municipalities of Montenegro. The municipal seat is the town of Tuzi. The municipality is located about 10 km south of the capital Podgorica and consists of more than 40 distinct settlements. The municipality roughly encompasses the Montenegrin part of Malesija (Albanian: Malësia) region.

Geography and location
Tuzi is situated to the northwest of Lake Shkodra, 10 km from Podgorica and 130 km to Tirana (Albania). It is located in surrounded by forests and mountains that are further connected with Accursed Mountains. Later developments also include a football stadium, Korita, Lake of Rikavac, Vitoja, wellspring in Traboin, Cem (river) etc. It is located along a main road between the City of Podgorica and the Albanian border crossing, just a few kilometers north of Lake Shkodra. The Church of St. Anthony and Qazimbeg's Mosque are located in the centre of the town. Tuzi is the newest municipality in Montenegro, becoming an independent municipality since 1 September 2018.

Local parliament

Settlements 
The Municipality of Tuzi consists of following towns and villages (2011 census):

Demographics
According to 2011 census, the town of Tuzi has a population of 4,748, while Tuzi Municipality has 11,422 residents. Out of this, roughly half are Albanians, 1/3 define themselves as ethnic Muslims, 1/4 as Bosniaks and the rest as Montenegrins. There is also a small community of Romani. According to the last national census of 2011 the newly formed municipality is made up of the following ethnic groups; 7.786 Albanians (68.44%), 1.050 Bosniaks (9.23%), 702 ethnic Muslims (6.17%), 1.137 Montenegrins (9.99%) 244 Serbs (2.15%) and 111 Romani people (0.98%).

Gallery

References 

Municipalities of Montenegro
Albanian communities in Montenegro
Tuzi Municipality